Carambeí is a municipality in the state of Paraná in the Southern Region of Brazil. The city originated from a farm that was an obligatory stop on the Caminho do Viamão between the central-west region of Rio Grande do Sul and the state of São Paulo.It was founded on April 4, 1911 by a group of Dutch immigrants and developed from the Cooperativa Batavo (now the Cooperative Frisia).

Etymology 
The origin of the name Cararambí derives from the Guarani “karumbe” (turtle) and “y” (water, river): the turtles river.

See also
List of municipalities in Paraná

References

Municipalities in Paraná